The 87th Emperor's Cup has been held between September 16, 2007 and January 1, 2008. It was won by Kashima Antlers.

Schedule

Matches

First round

Second round

Third round

Fourth round
Played on November 4, except Gamba vs. Yamagata and Kawasaki vs. Cerezo (November 7) and Urawa vs. Ehime (November 28 due to 2007 Asian Champions League commitments).

1Score after 90 minutes

Fifth round

Quarterfinals

Semifinals

Final

External links
 Official site of the 87th Emperor's Cup 

2007
Emperors Cup, 2007
Emperors Cup, 2007
2008 in Japanese football